Lacanobia blenna, the stranger, is a moth of the family Noctuidae. The species was first described by Jacob Hübner in 1824. It is found in southern Europe, east to Turkmenistan.

Technical description and variation

The wingspan is 36–44 mm. Forewing
greyish ochreous, the median area tinged with brownish or fuscous; claviform stigma indistinct, black-edged, followed by a pale patch at base of vein 2; orbicular and reniform pale, partly black-edged, the lower lobe of the latter dark; submarginal line pale, with brown on each side of it, dentate to margin along veins 3 and 4; costa and apex pale; hindwing dull whitish, browner towards termen; the veins dark. Larva yellow, dotted with brown, especially on dorsal areathe brown dots ringed with pale, forming dorsal and subdorsal lines; lateral and spiracular lines yellow.

Biology
The moth flies from May to August depending on the location.

The larvae feed on sea beet and Salsola kali.

References

External links

"73.269 [B&F: 2161] Stranger (Lacanobia blenna) (Hübner, [1824])". Hantsmoths.

Lepiforum e.V.

Lacanobia
Moths of Europe
Moths of Asia
Taxa named by Jacob Hübner
Moths described in 1824